Poole Pirates (also known as Poole Speedway) are a motorcycle speedway team based in Poole, England, competing in the SGB Championship. The club have been the champions of the United Kingdom on ten occasions.
 
Poole Speedway is promoted by local businessman Matt Ford and son Danny Ford, who took over promoting rights of the club in 1998. The team is managed by past rider and former Great Britain team manager Neil Middleditch. Wimborne Road Stadium has been home to the club since it was founded in 1948. In August 2004, Poole hosted the Speedway World Cup final, which was won by Sweden.

Stadium

Poole Stadium (also known as Wimborne Road Stadium), has been the Pirates' home track since the club was created in 1948. It is situated near to the town centre and is owned by Poole Borough Council. The stadium's capacity was limited to 5,500 people in 2008 for safety reasons. Prior to 1948, the stadium had been used as a cycle track and had been home to Poole Town Football Club since 1933. There is an all seater grandstand on the home straight, and a glass fronted grandstand on the back straight. The viewing areas on the track bends are un-sheltered and standing only.

At the start of 1948 the tarmac cycle track was dug up and replaced with a  speedway track. A steel safety fence was erected around the outside of the track and the football pitch remained within the centre of the track. The first speedway meeting took place in the stadium on 26 April 1948, in tragic circumstances. The match against the Yarmouth Bloaters, which Poole won 74–32, saw Yarmouth's Reg Craven killed in the first race in the very first match at the track. A sheltered 1,100 seat grandstand was erected on the home straight in 1960 and is still in use. The terracing on the back straight of the speedway track was demolished in 1997 and replaced with a new glass fronted grandstand incorporating a 440 seat restaurant, two bars, Tote betting facilities and multiple viewing screens. Stadia UK were issued a long term lease on the stadium by the council, with the Pirates promotion sub-leasing use of the stadium and facilities from Stadia UK.

In 2004, Poole Stadium was chosen to host the Speedway World Cup final by organiser Benfield Sports International (BSI). Poole hosted the race-off on 5 August, in which Sweden and Poland progressed to the final. The final took place on 7 August with Sweden becoming World Champions, defeating Great Britain into second place by one point. Temporary stands were erected around the corners of the track to provide 2,200 extra seats. The official attendance figure at the stadium for the final was 7,131.

History

1947–1964
In 1947, Bournemouth based Exeter Falcons riders Tommy Crutcher and Charlie Hayden created a consortium, which also included Crutcher's brother Jack and Herby Hayden, with the aim of opening a speedway club closer to their home. The consortium applied to Poole Borough Council in 1947 to stage speedway racing in the town and the council approved their request on 6 January 1948. The Pirates lined up for their inaugural season as members of the National League Division Three. Tony Lewis was signed in 1949 and Ken Middleditch signed from Hastings in 1950, and they formed an effective pairing for the Pirates. Poole won their first title in 1951 and were promoted to the National League Division Two. Brian Crutcher signed for Poole in 1951 and the following year he became the first Poole rider to reach a World Speedway Final in 1952. Poole won the Division Two title at the first attempt, but were denied First Division status by the Speedway Control Board, who claimed that Poole were not a big enough club to be able to sustain top flight racing. The following two years (1953 and 1954) saw the Pirates narrowly finishing as Division Two runners up and Brian Crutcher left Poole to sign for National League team Wembley at the start of the 1953 season.

In 1955, the Pirates again won the Division Two Championship and were allowed promotion to Division One of the National League, becoming the only club to ever have won promotion from the bottom league to the top tier. However, by the end of the 1956 season, the Poole promoters closed the club, blaming poor attendances and the introduction of fuel rationing due to the Suez Crisis. Despite losing their league status, Poole Stadium continued to stage meetings during 1957, including two National League meetings. Rayleigh Rockets promoter Vic Gooden took over the promoting rights of Poole at the end of the year and Poole rejoined the National League in 1958.

Southampton Saints promoter Charles Knott took over from Gooden in 1960 and brought back the successful pairing of Middleditch and Lewis. Ross Gilbertson was also signed and Geoff Mudge was brought over from Australia. The stadium was redeveloped and the track was made slightly smaller to accommodate a greyhound racing track. Also that year, the speedway league structure was re-formed and Poole opted to join the newly formed Provincial League. Poole finished joint top of the table with Rayleigh, but lost out on points difference. Success returned to Poole with the Provincial League title in 1961 and 1962.

1965–1996
Following a power struggle between the Speedway Control Board and speedway club promoters, the British League was formed in 1965. Poole joined the British League (the top league Division) with 18 other teams and remained there for the next 20 years. They won the British League title in 1969 with Pete Smith, who would eventually go on to score over 3,287 points for the club, the biggest contributor. Smith was supported with contributions from team captain Geoff Mudge, Bruce Cribb, Gordon Guasco, Frank Shuter and Odd Fossengen who was in his second year at Poole and would become a fans favourite.

Major changes in personnel took place in 1974, with the arrival of riders such as Colin Gooddy and Neil Middleditch, son of former rider Ken Middleditch. In 1975, Poole completed the signing of Malcolm Simmons from King's Lynn. Simmons finished top of the Poole riders averages for the next six seasons and in 1976 finished in second place at the Speedway World Championship. Mid-way through the 1979 season, Reg Fearman bought the promoting rights and continued to run the club until 1984 when financial problems forced the club to close.

The club was rescued by the then Weymouth Wildcats promoters Peter Ansell and Mervyn Stewkesbury, who moved their team to Poole for the start of the 1985 season. The team name was changed to the Poole Wildcats and they entered the National League – the second league tier of speedway. The name change proved to be unpopular and was reverted to the Poole Pirates after two seasons. Australian manager Neil Street was appointed as Poole team manager and an influx of young Australian riders began, including Craig Boyce and Leigh Adams in 1988. Poole finished as National League runners up 1988, were National League champions in 1989, and then won a League and Knockout Cup double in 1990, led by captain Alun Rossiter. After the 1990 season, the leagues were re-structured and Poole re-joined the top flight of speedway – the British League. Poole won the league championship in 1994 led by Boyce, 1993 signing Lars Gunnestad and a young Jason Crump, grandson of manager Neil Street. In 1997 the structure of the leagues was once again changed with Poole joining the Elite League.

1997–2019

Poole initially struggled in the Elite League and were sold to local businessmen Matt Ford and Mike Golding in 1998. In a clear out at the club, only Magnus Zetterström remained from the 1998 season and Neil Street was replaced as manager by former rider Neil Middleditch. Craig Boyce left for Oxford, Lee Richardson was signed from Reading, Gary Havelock was brought in as Captain and Mark Loram was signed from Wolverhampton. Loram was to become the first Pirate to lift the World Championship title with his success in 2000.

Poole finished as Elite League runners up in 1999 and 2001. Tony Rickardsson joined Poole in 2001 and won the World Championship that year and the year after. Leigh Adams joined in 2003 and together they spearheaded the team to a triple championship of Elite League, Knockout Cup and the British League Cup. The Pirates followed up 2003 with another successful year in 2004 despite the loss of Grand Prix riders Adams and Rickardsson. Solid point scoring from Bjarne Pedersen, Antonio Lindback and Ryan Sullivan led Poole to an Elite League and Knockout Cup double and Poole became the first top flight club to achieve back to back League and Cup doubles since 1960. The Pirates won their third Elite League championship in 2008, defeating the Lakeside Hammers in the play-off final with an aggregate score of 108–75. in 2011 the Poole pirates dominated the league, spearheaded by Chris Holder and Darcy Ward, and finished the season off by defeating the Eastbourne Eagles in the play-off final. Poole operated an additional team, Bournemouth Buccaneers, in the National League in 2009 and 2010. Despite successful seasons on track, spectator support was disappointing and the operation was terminated.

The success of Poole continued with a Knockout Cup win in 2012 and being crowned champions in three successive years during the 2013, 2014 and 2015 seasons. The team won their tenth highest league title after winning the SGB Premiership 2018.

2020–Present 
In 2020, the leagues were cancelled due to the COVID-19 pandemic and the Pirates did not make their expected debut in the SGB Championship (second division). The following season in 2021, the Pirates finished top of the regular season table and secured a place in the playoff semi finals. Poole duly won their playoff semi final against Leicester and met Glasgow in the final. Shortly afterwards the Pirates won the division 2 Knockout Cup for the third time in their history and then completed the league and cup double by winning the Play off final. The following season in 2022, the success continued as the team dominated again, winning the SGB Championship and Knockout Cup 'double double'.

Season summary

Season Summary (Juniors)

Honours

League
FIM World Speedway League
Runners Up (1): 2014

 British League/Elite League/SGB Premiership 
Winners (10): 1969, 1994, 2003, 2004, 2008, 2011, 2013, 2014, 2015 & 2018

National League Division Two/Provincial League/National League/SGB Championship
Winners (7): 1952, 1955, 1961, 1962, 1989, 1990 & 2021

National League Division Three
Winners (1): 1951

Cup
Elite League Knockout Cup
Winners (5): 2003, 2004, 2010, 2011, 2012

National Trophy/National League Knockout Cup/SGB Championship Knockout CupWinners (5): 1952, 1955, 1990, 2021, 2022British League CupWinners (1): 2003Craven ShieldWinners (3): 2001, 2002 & 2006Elite Shield/Premiership ShieldWinners (6): 2012, 2014, 2015, 2016, 2017 & 2019Elite League Pairs ChampionshipWinners (3):''' 2007, 2009 & 2011

World Champions
Mark Loram was the first Poole rider to win the Speedway World Championship with his success in 2000. Tony Rickardsson joined Poole in 2001 following Loram's departure to Peterborough, and won the World Championship in 2001 and 2002 while riding for the Pirates. Chris Holder is the latest World Champion to ride for the Pirates securing his first Speedway Grand Prix title in October 2012.

Malcolm Simmons won the World Pairs Championship for England three times during his Poole career in 1976, 1977 and 1978, he also won the World Team Cup in 1975 and 1977. Antonio Lindbäck won the Speedway World Cup in for Sweden 2004, and Denmark's Bjarne Pedersen has won the World Cup on two occasions; in 2006 and 2008. Australian Jason Crump was the first Pirate to win the Speedway World Under 21 Championship in 1995. England's Lee Richardson (1999), Poland's Krzysztof Kasprzak (2005) and Australian Darcy Ward (2010) have also won the World Under 21 Championship while riding for Poole.

Notable former riders
The following riders have been voted into the Pirates Hall of Fame by supporters:

Testimonial riders 
Seven Poole riders have received testimonials at the club, usually for being a Poole asset for 10 years or more.
 1976  Pete Smith
 1984  Neil Middleditch
 1995  Steve Schofield
 2000  Alun Rossiter
 2001  Lars Gunnestad
 2003  Craig Boyce
 2005  Magnus Zetterström
 2009  Bjarne Pedersen
 2011  Davey Watt

References

Speedway Elite League teams
Sport in Poole
Sport in Dorset